Kirsten Wall (born November 27, 1975 as Kirsten Harmark) is a Canadian curler from Milton, Ontario.  She was the alternate player on the Jennifer Jones rink which represented Canada at the 2014 Winter Olympics, receiving a gold medal.

Curling career
In 1995 she, alongside teammates Nicole Pelligrin, Catherine Kemp and younger sister Audra Harmark, won the Ontario provincial junior curling championship as a skip, earning her team the right to represent Ontario at the 1995 Canadian Junior Curling Championships. She lost in the final that year to Kelly MacKenzie (Scott).

A number of years later, Wall joined the Sherry Middaugh team, first as her alternate, and then in 2002 as her third. In 2003, Wall won the Canada Cup of Curling as third for Middaugh. Wall played in her first Tournament of Hearts in 2004 after not having played in two previous trip as Middaugh's alternate.  The team lost in the semi-final to Quebec's Marie-France Larouche. In 2008, the team went to the Hearts again, losing in the semi-final to Manitoba's Jennifer Jones.

Wall left the Middaugh team in 2010 to form her own rink with Hollie Nicol, Danielle Inglis and Jill Mouzar. The team lasted for two seasons.

Wall joined the Jennifer Jones team for the first half of the 2012/13 season playing third, as Jones was expecting her first child and sat out until January.

Personal life
Wall studied Biology and Genetics at McMaster University and the Michener Institute for Applied Health Sciences. She is a senior genetic technologist at Credit Valley Hospital in Mississauga. She is married to Trevor Wall, who had competed at the 2004 Nokia Brier.

Grand Slam record

Former events

References

External links
 

1975 births
Canadian women curlers
Curlers from Ontario
Living people
People from Milton, Ontario
People from Oakville, Ontario
Curlers at the 2014 Winter Olympics
Olympic curlers of Canada
Olympic gold medalists for Canada
Olympic medalists in curling
Medalists at the 2014 Winter Olympics
Continental Cup of Curling participants
Canada Cup (curling) participants